This is a list of notable systems management systems.


Overview

See also 
 Configuration management
 Comparison of network monitoring systems
 Comparison of open source configuration management software
 Systems management

 
 
Systems management